Las Hermanas may refer to:

Las Hermanas (organization), feminist Catholic organization for Spanish speaking women
Las Hermanas (ballet), 1971 ballet
Las hermanas Gilda, Spanish fictional comic characters
Las Hermanas Montoya, American Latin music singing group
Las Hermanas (TV series), Philippine TV series